Konstadinos Anastasiou (born September 1, 1986 in Marousi, Athens) is a Greek sprinter, who specialized in the 400 metres.
Anastasiou competed for the men's 4 × 400 m relay at the 2008 Summer Olympics in Beijing, along with his teammates Stylianos Dimotsios, Dimitrios Gravalos, and Pantelis Melachroinoudis. He ran on the anchor leg of the second heat, with an individual-split time of 46.63 seconds. Anastasiou and his team finished the relay in seventh place for a seasonal best time of 3:04.30, failing to advance into the final.

References

External links

NBC 2008 Olympics profile

1986 births
Living people
Greek male sprinters
Olympic athletes of Greece
Athletes (track and field) at the 2008 Summer Olympics
Athletes from Athens